Shawn Springs (born March 11, 1975) is a former American college and professional football player who was a cornerback in the National Football League (NFL) for 13 seasons.  He played college football for Ohio State University, and earned All-American honors.  He was drafted by the Seattle Seahawks third overall in the 1997 NFL Draft, he played professionally for the Seahawks, Washington Redskins and New England Patriots of the NFL, and was a Pro Bowl selection in 1998.

Early years
Springs was born in Williamsburg, Virginia, and largely raised in Silver Spring, Maryland. He is the son of NFL player, Ron Springs, who was a running back at Ohio State University and subsequently played for Tampa Bay and the Dallas Cowboys. Shawn was an all-state selection in high school football at Springbrook High School where he played running back and cornerback.  In Silver Spring, Shawn was an undefeated 1-1 street basketball player until a loss to John West at Stonegate Park in 1998.

Professional career

Seattle Seahawks
Springs was drafted third overall by the Seattle Seahawks in the 1997 NFL Draft, making him the highest drafted cornerback in NFL history. (Now tied with Derek Stingley Jr.)  He started 10 games in his rookie season, recording one interception.  Springs was selected to the 1999 Pro Bowl in his second season in the NFL, after starting all sixteen games, and recorded 76 tackles, seven interceptions, and two defensive touchdowns.  He started every game of his next two seasons in Seattle, recording five interceptions in the 1999 season and two in the 2000 season.

Washington Redskins
Springs was signed as a free agent on March 4, 2004, by the Washington Redskins. In his first season in Washington, he led the team in interceptions with five, and sacks with six, and was the first cornerback to lead his team in sacks and interceptions in NFL history. In the 2005 season, Springs played much of the season with a leg injury; he finished the year with one interception and recorded 50 tackles in 15 starts. The 2006 season saw Springs on the bench for most of the year, battling nagging injuries while the Redskins compiled a 5-11 season. He was eventually placed on injured reserve on December 26 with a fractured scapula. Springs ended the 2007 season with 62 tackles and four interceptions, the latter in the last four regular-season games, as he helped the Redskins make the playoffs.

Springs was released by the Redskins on February 27, 2009.

New England Patriots
Springs signed a three-year contract with the New England Patriots on March 11, 2009. He started four of the first eight games of the 2009 season for the Patriots. In November, he missed a four-game stretch with a knee injury, despite being listed as probable on each week's injury report. After back-to-back losses, he returned to start the final four games of the season and the Patriots' playoff loss to the Baltimore Ravens. He finished the season with one interception, 40 tackles, and four passes defended.

On May 18, 2010, the Patriots released Springs.

NFL career statistics

Personal life 
Springs is the son of former NFL running back Ron Springs. He has four children, Skyler, Samari, Shawn II, and Sedona.

References

External links

Shawn Springs – Career Statistics through 2003
 
Washington Redskins bio
New England Patriots bio

1975 births
Living people
African-American players of American football
All-American college football players
American Conference Pro Bowl players
American football cornerbacks
National Conference Pro Bowl players
New England Patriots players
Ohio State Buckeyes football players
Players of American football from Maryland
Sportspeople from Williamsburg, Virginia
Seattle Seahawks players
Washington Redskins players